Indiah-Paige Janita Riley (born 20 December 2001) is a New Zealand professional women's footballer who plays as a striker for Brisbane Roar in the A-League Women. She has previously played fo Fortuna Hjorring in the Elitedivisionen.

Club career

Brisbane Roar
Indiah-Paige Riley made her professional debut on 4 November 2018 for Brisbane Roar against the Western Sydney Wanderers coming on as a substitute for Allira Toby in a 1–0 win.

She was nominated for the W-League's Young Player of the Year award in the 2019–20 W-League season.

Fortuna Hjorring 
Riley signed for Danish champions Fortuna Hjorring on 3 August 2020.

Return to Brisbane Roar
In January 2023, Riley returned to Australia, signing with former club Brisbane Roar until the end of the 2022–23 A-League Women season.

International career 
After previously representing Australia, Riley decided to commit her international career and switch for New Zealand. She receives her first call-up with New Zealand for two friendly games vs Mexico and Philippines on 2 and 6 September 2022 and made her debut with New Zealand as a substitute in first game aforementioned.

Career statistics

Club 

1Danish Women's Cup.
2UEFA Women's Champions League

References

External links
 Indiah-Paige Riley at Soccerway
Indiah-Paige Riley  at Brisbane Roar

2001 births
Living people
A-League Women players
Women's association football forwards
Australian women's soccer players
Association footballers from Auckland
New Zealand expatriate sportspeople in Australia
New Zealand expatriate sportspeople in Denmark
Expatriate women's footballers in Denmark
Expatriate women's soccer players in Australia
New Zealand expatriate women's association footballers
Fortuna Hjørring players
Brisbane Roar FC (A-League Women) players
Australia women's international soccer players
New Zealand women's association footballers
New Zealand women's international footballers
Dual internationalists (women's football)